Reginald Pecock (or Peacock; c. 1395– c. 1461) was a Welsh prelate, scholastic, and writer.

Life

Pecock was probably born in Laugharne and was educated at Oriel College, Oxford.

Having been ordained priest in 1421, Pecock secured a mastership at Whittington College, London, in 1431 where he was also parish priest of St. Michael Paternoster Royal, the adjacent parish church.  On 14 June 1444 he was consecrated as Bishop of St Asaph, and translated as Bishop of Chichester on 23 March 1450. In 1454 he became a member of the privy council.  

He wrote books of both a pedagogical and polemical nature. His pedagogical books, in which he proposes a wholly new catechism include The Donet, The Follower to the Donet, and The Rule of Christian Religion. He joined the debate on Christian doctrine in his Repressing of Over Mich Wyting [blaming] the Clergie, 1449, and Book of Faith, 1456. These were both more cogent than the Lollard tenets, and sought to stay the Lollard movement by setting aside ecclesiastical infallibility, and taking the appeal to Scripture and reason alone.  It was principally Pecock's appeal to reason and his attack on the primacy of episcopal authority for which he was deprived in 1458.

In attacking the Lollards, Pecock put forward the following religious views: he asserted that the Scriptures were not the only standard of right and wrong; he questioned some of the articles of the creed and the infallibility of the Church; he wished "bi cleer witte drawe men into consente of trewe feith otherwise than bi fire and swerd or hangement" and in general he exalted the authority of reason. Owing to these views, the archbishop of Canterbury, Thomas Bourchier, ordered his writings to be examined. This was done and he was found guilty of heresy.

Pecock was removed from the privy council and he publicly (at St Paul's Cross, 4 December 1457), renounced his opinions in accordance with his previously stated opinion about the need for obedience in all matters to the Church hierarchy. Pecock, who has been called "the most prolific English theologian of the 15th century", was then forced to resign his bishopric in January 1459, and was removed to Thorney Abbey in Cambridgeshire, where he doubtless remained until his death about 1461.

The bishop's chief work is the famous Represser of over-much weeting [blaming] of the Clergie, which was issued c. 1449–1455. In addition to its great importance in the history of the Lollard movement the Represser has an exceptional interest as a model of the English of the time, Pecock being one of the first writers to use the vernacular. In thought and style alike it is the work of a man of learning and ability.

A biography of Pecock is added to the edition of the Repressor published by Churchill Babington for the Rolls Series in 1860.

Extant works
The Repressing of Over Mich Wyting of the Clergie (The Repressor of Over Much Blaming of the Clergy),(1449); ed.Churchill Babington; Longman, Green and Roberts, (2 vols,London, 1860).
The Book of Faith (1456), ed. J. L. Morison, (Glasgow, 1909).
The Donet, ed. E. V. Hitchcock, (London, 1921).
The Follower of the Donet, ed. E. V. Hitchcock (Oxford, 1971).
The Reule of Crysten Religioun, by Reginald Pecock ... now first edited from Pierpont Morgan Ms. 519, by William Cabell Greet; London, H. Milford, Oxford University Press, 1927; & New York, 1971); Millwood, N.Y., Kraus Reprint, 1987.

Citations

References
 
 

1395 births
1460 deaths
People from Laugharne
Bishops of Chichester
Bishops of St Asaph
Alumni of Oriel College, Oxford
15th-century Roman Catholic bishops in England
15th-century Roman Catholic bishops in Wales
Welsh bishops
15th-century Welsh clergy